Patricia Burton  (November 16, 1932 – March 26, 2018) was an All-American Girls Professional Baseball League player. Burton batted and threw right handed. She was born in Steele, Missouri. She died in March 2018 at the age of 85. She later played basketball for Holmes Community College and was recruited by the All-American Red Heads.

Notes
 Little is known about this player. Burton appears as a member of the Fort Wayne Daisies club during its 1950 season. Nevertheless, the league stopped individual achievements after 1948, so individual accomplishments are complete only through 1949.
 She is part of the AAGPBL permanent display at the Baseball Hall of Fame and Museum at Cooperstown, New York opened in 1988, which is dedicated to the entire league rather than any individual figure.

Sources

1932 births
2018 deaths
All-American Girls Professional Baseball League players
Fort Wayne Daisies players
Basketball players from Missouri
Baseball players from Missouri
People from Pemiscot County, Missouri
21st-century American women